The Remix Album is an album released by Milli Vanilli in 1990. Due to the significant differences between the original Milli Vanilli debut album, All or Nothing and the North America-only Girl You Know It's True release, producer Frank Farian decided to repackage these previously unreleased songs in a remix album. The album peaked at number thirty-two in the US and was certified Gold by the RIAA in July 1990.

The songs that had been unreleased in the US are "Money", "Hush", "Can't You Feel My Love" and "Boy in the Tree". Most of the songs on this album are completely remixed from the version included on the group's European debut album.

Track listing

Personnel
 Charles Shaw – vocals, backing vocals
 John Davis – vocals, backing vocals
 Brad Howell – vocals
 Jodie Rocco – vocals
 Linda Rocco – vocals
 Frank Farian – producer

Charts

References

Albums produced by Frank Farian
1990 remix albums
Arista Records remix albums